Sword of the Samurai may refer to:

Sword of the Samurai (computer game), a 1989 American MS-DOS video game
 Sword of the Samurai (gamebook), a 1986 roleplaying gamebook by Mark Smith and Jamie Thomson
 Kengo 2: Legacy of the Blade, released in Europe in 2003 as Sword of the Samurai, a Japanese fighting video game
"Sword of the Samurai" (Hawaiian Eye), a television episode
Time Machine 3: Sword of the Samurai, a 1984 children's novel in the Time Machine series

See also
Katana, a sword with a curved, single-edged blade used by the samurai of ancient and feudal Japan